ORP Rybitwa was a  of the Polish Navy at the outset of World War II. Rybitwa participated in the defence of Poland during the Nazi German invasion of 1939. The ship was damaged by a German bomb on 14 September 1939. The ship was later captured by the Germans, but returned to serve under the Polish flag after the War.

History

Construction 
Rybitwa was constructed in the riverine dockyard in Modlin between 1933 and 1935. The first commander of the ship was Lieutenant Commander Jerzy Kossakowski. The ship was named after the bird tern, "Rybitwa" in Polish.

Service 
Lieutenant Commander Kazimierz Miładowski was the captain of the ship during the September campaign. After arriving in Gdynia she conducted reconnaissance operations in Gdańsk Bay, between the Free City of Danzig and the East Prussian coast. On 1 September 1939, after the outbreak of the Second World War, Rybitwa and all other 5 minesweepers of her class joined with the minelayer  and took part in the Operation Rurka, an attempt to mine the entrances of the Gdańsk Bay.

The Polish flotilla, which included the destroyer  and two gunboats, was attacked by a large formation of German bombers. Rybitwas sister ship, was hit. Despite the great risk involved, the captain of Rybitwa, Miładowski, made the decision to tow Mewa into port; the operation was a success.
In the next few weeks, the ship was based at the port of Jastarnia and conducted patrols and mine laying operations at night, while defending the Hel peninsula during the day. On 19 September, Rybitwa was damaged by bombs while still in port - most of the crew were not onboard at the time. In order to prevent capture by German troops, the ship was scuttled soon after. The Polish defense of Hel peninsula lasted until 2 October. The Germans refloated the ship, renamed her Rixhöft and commissioned her into the Kriegsmarine. After the end of World War II the Polish naval mission in Germany found Rybitwa together with three of her sister ships in Travemünde. The Polish flag was raised again and her original name was restored. Though under British supervision, the German crew purposely destroyed much of their equipment but Polish sailors managed to make the ships seaworthy again and the ships returned to Poland.

Rybitwa served in various roles up to 1972 when she was finally decommissioned and scrapped.

In popular culture 
Rybitwa, along with other Polish ships of the Jaskółka class, is mentioned in the Günter Grass novella Cat and Mouse.

References

External links
 pics of Rybitwa on www.1939.pl

Jaskółka-class minesweepers
Ships built in Poland
Naval ships of Poland captured by Germany during World War II
1935 ships
Maritime incidents in October 1939
Scuttled vessels
Shipwrecks of Poland